Leucopogon glaucifolius is a species of flowering plant in the family Ericaceae and is endemic to the south-west of Western Australia. It is an erect or spreading shrub with linear, sharply-pointed leaves, and white, tube-shaped flowers.

Description
The flowers are borne in leaf axils in groups of mostly three on a short peduncle with small bracts and egg-shaped bracteoles less than half as long as the sepals.

Taxonomy
Leucopogon glaucifolius was first formally described in 1903 by William Vincent Fitzgerald in the Proceedings of the Linnean Society of New South Wales from specimens collected near Midland Junction in 1902. The specific epithet (glaucifolius) means "glaucous-leaved".

Distribution
This leucopogon occurs in the Geraldton Sandplains, Jarrah Forest and Swan Coastal Plain bioregions of south-western Western Australia.

References

glaucifolius
Ericales of Australia
Flora of Western Australia
Plants described in 1903
Taxa named by William Vincent Fitzgerald